Stahnke is a German surname. Notable people with the surname include:

Angela Stahnke, German speedskater
Günter Stahnke, German film director
Herbert Stahnke, American biologist
Manfred Stahnke, German composer and musicologist 
Susan Stahnke, German TV presenter
Wayne Stahnke, Austrian inventor of  electro-mechanical reproducing pianos manufactured by Bösendorfer 

German-language surnames